Pat Cash defeated Ivan Lendl in the final, 7–6(7–5), 6–2, 7–5 to win the gentlemen's singles tennis title at the 1987 Wimbledon Championships. It was Lendl's second runner-up finish at Wimbledon, preventing him from completing the career Grand Slam.

Boris Becker was the two-time defending champion, but lost in the second round to Peter Doohan.

Future champion Andre Agassi made his first appearance in the main draw at Wimbledon, losing in the first round to Henri Leconte. Agassi would not compete at Wimbledon again until 1991 due to his disagreement with the All England Club's dress code.

Seeds

  Boris Becker (second round)
  Ivan Lendl (final)
  Mats Wilander (quarterfinals)
  Stefan Edberg (semifinals)
  Miloslav Mečíř (third round)
  Yannick Noah (second round)
  Jimmy Connors (semifinals)
  Andrés Gómez (fourth round)
  Henri Leconte (quarterfinals)
  Tim Mayotte (third round)
  Pat Cash (champion)
  Brad Gilbert (third round)
  Joakim Nyström (third round)
  Emilio Sánchez (fourth round)
  David Pate (second round)
  Kevin Curren (second round)

Qualifying

Draw

Finals

Top half

Section 1

Section 2

Section 3

Section 4

Bottom half

Section 5

Section 6

Section 7

Section 8

References

External links

 1987 Wimbledon Championships – Men's draws and results at the International Tennis Federation

Men's Singles
Wimbledon Championship by year – Men's singles